Marilyn Jeanne McGuire (February 22, 1926 – August 7, 2021) was an American actress and contralto singer who was active in the 1940s.

Life and career
McGuire was born on February 22, 1926, to James Joseph McGuire, a film projectionist and Annona (née Crowley) McGuire. Her parents divorced in the early 1930s, while McGuire was still a child.

McGuire signed a contract with RKO Pictures and was subsequently cast in her first film at the age of sixteen, Seven Days' Leave (1942), which starred Lucille Ball. Her other films include Higher and Higher (1944, starring Frank Sinatra), Career Girl (1944), Seven Days Ashore (1944),  It Happened in Brooklyn (1947)  and You Gotta Stay Happy (1948). Her penultimate film before retiring from Hollywood was Jumping Jacks (1952),  with Dean Martin and Jerry Lewis. She also had a minor uncredited role in Disney's Summer Magic (1963) as a young maid named Ellen by putting on an Irish accent before her permanent retirement. 

McGuire was married to actor Wally Cassell from 1947 until his death in 2015. The couple had two children. She died in Palm Desert, California on August 7, 2021, at the age of 95. News of her death was only made public in August 2022, by film historians Austin and Howard Mutti-Mewse.

Filmography

References

External links

Marcy McGuire at the American Film Institute

1926 births
2021 deaths
20th-century American actresses
21st-century American women
American film actresses
American women singers
RKO Pictures contract players
Actresses from Kansas City, Kansas